Schmidtia pappophoroides is a perennial grass belonging to the grass family (Poaceae). It is native to southern and western Africa and the Cape Verde. Schmidtia pappophoroides can be used to thatch roofs, and it is a valuable fodder grass in Namibia.

References

Chloridoideae
Flora of Namibia
Flora of Cape Verde
Forages
Plants described in 1852